The 1970 Arizona gubernatorial election took place on November 3, 1970. Incumbent Governor Jack Williams ran for reelection to a third term as governor. United States Ambassador to Bolivia Raúl Héctor Castro won the Democratic nomination, and narrowly lost the general election to Williams by 1.78%. Williams was sworn into his third and final term as Governor on January 5, 1971.

Due to a constitutional amendment approved by the voters in 1968, the length of the term of Governor of Arizona was changed from two years to four years, effective with the 1970 gubernatorial election. Thus, Williams became the first Governor of Arizona to serve a 4-year term.

Republican primary

Candidates
 Jack Williams, incumbent Governor

Democratic primary

Candidates
 Raúl Héctor Castro, United States Ambassador to Bolivia, former United States Ambassador to El Salvador
 Jack Ross, car dealer
 George Nader, former Mayor

Results

General election

Results overview

Results by county

References

1970
1970 United States gubernatorial elections
Gubernatorial